Eugene Floyd Phillips (May 25, 1915 – January 10, 1990)  was an American jump blues guitarist and singer.

Career
He was born in St. Louis, Missouri, and took up the ukulele and later the guitar as a child.  He also sang, influenced by, and a fan of, Big Joe Turner, Jimmy Rushing, Louis Jordan, and Wynonie Harris.  He joined the St Louis bands of Dewey Jackson and Jimmy Powell and was later taught lap steel guitar by Floyd Smith.  He later went on to join Lorenzo Flennoy's Trio.  A pioneer of the lap steel guitar, he recorded with the Ink Spots and the Mills Brothers, among others.  In late 1945 he recorded with Lucky Thompson in a band also featuring Marshal Royal and Charles Mingus.

His Rhythm Aces, the band he used on his Modern recordings for the Bihari Brothers, included Jake Porter, trumpet; drummer Al "Cake" Wichard; Maxwell Davis, Marshal Royal, Jack McVea, Bumps Meyers, Willard McDaniel, Lloyd Glenn, Bill Street and Art Edwards.  His repertoire included "Big Fat Mama", "Big Legs", "Fatso", and "Punkin' Head Woman".

Phillips died in Lakewood, California, in 1990.

References

External links
Partial discography

1915 births
1990 deaths
Jump blues musicians
American blues singers
American blues guitarists
American male guitarists
Modern Records artists
Musicians from St. Louis
20th-century American guitarists
20th-century American singers
Singers from Missouri
Guitarists from Missouri
20th-century American male singers